Dermoflata rotundata is a species of planthopper in the family Flatidae. It is the only species in the monotypic genus Dermoflata. It was first described by Leopold Melichar in 1901. It is found in Indonesia and Malaysia.

References 

Flatidae
Monotypic Hemiptera genera